Song of the Open Road is a 1944 musical comedy film directed by S. Sylvan Simon, from a screenplay by Irving Phillips and Edward Verdier.  It was the debut film of teenage singer Jane Powell. Powell's real name was Suzanne Burce, but prior to the release of this film MGM assigned her the stage name "Jane Powell" (the name of the character she portrays in this film).

Overview
Child film star Jane Powell, tired of her life being run by her stage mother, runs away from home and tries to lead a "normal" life at a Crops Corps camp. When a crop needs picking, Powell enlists the help of some celebrity friends.

This was W. C. Fields's next-to-last film; his last (Sensations of 1945) would be released only 9 days after this film was issued. In the film, Fields — who began his career as an accomplished juggler — plays himself and juggles some oranges for a few moments. He remarks "This used to be my racket". Then, missing a catch, he drops the oranges and walks away muttering "used to be my racket, but it isn't anymore!"

Cast
 Jane Powell as Jane Powell
 Bonita Granville as Bonnie
 Peggy O'Neill as Peggy
 Jackie Moran as Jack Moran
 Bill Christy as Bill
 Reginald Denny as Director Curtis
 Regis Toomey as Connors
 Rose Hobart as Mrs. Powell
 Sig Arno as Spolo
 Edgar Bergen as Edgar 
 Charlie McCarthy as Charlie
 W. C. Fields as himself
 Sammy Kaye and His Orchestra as Themselves
 Frank, Harry and Steve Condos as Condos Brothers
 The Lipham Four as The Lipham Four
 Irene Tedrow as Miss Casper
 Pat Starling as Pat
 Hollywood Canteen Kids as Themselves
 Catron & Popp as Themselves

Production
Director S. Sylvan Simon had terrible difficulty filming scenes with W. C. Fields due to Fields' alcoholism. After lunch hour he was often nowhere to be found. This problem was solved by luring Fields into his truck early in the day and removing the ladder. Fields would often rant and complain before eventually falling asleep.

Although Fields often made fun of singers and singing in general, he had a fondness for the promising young singer Jane Powell and even referred to her (as "little Janie Powell") on one of his CBS radio broadcasts (preserved on transcription discs). Powell sang several songs in the film and made such an impression that MGM signed her to a contract to make a number of musical comedies for them, through the mid-1950s. Powell's real name was Suzanne Burce, but prior to the release of this film, MGM assigned her the stage name "Jane Powell", the name of the character she portrays in this film.

Location shooting was done in Palm Springs, California and at the Pan-Pacific Auditorium in Los Angeles.

Award nominations

References

External links
 
 

1944 films
American black-and-white films
American musical comedy films
Films directed by S. Sylvan Simon
Films shot in California
United Artists films
1944 musical comedy films
1940s English-language films
1940s American films